Edward Phillip Pickering  (born 1 November 1939) is a former Australian politician. He was a Liberal Member of the New South Wales Legislative Council from 1976 to 1995.

Pickering was born in Newcastle, and studied for a Bachelor of Science majoring in chemical engineering at the University of New South Wales. He worked as a production executive and professional consultant for twenty-eight years, travelling widely to many countries including the United States, Canada, the United Kingdom, Poland, Russia, France and Germany. He had served in the University Regiment from 1958 to 1968.

In 1976, Pickering was elected to the New South Wales Legislative Council as a member of the Liberal Party. In 1984 he was elected Leader of the Opposition in the Legislative Council.  When the Coalition under Nick Greiner won Government in 1988, Pickering was appointed Leader of the Government in the Legislative Council, Vice-President of the Executive Council and Minister for Police and Emergency Services.

His portfolio experienced some changes during 1992 when John Fahey became Premier. It was during Fahey's early months as Premier that Pickering was shifted from Police to Justice after a breakdown in relations between Pickering and police commissioner Tony Lauer. Pickering however lasted in the Justice portfolio for a month when he resigned.

In 1994 he returned to Cabinet in a Cabinet reshuffle and was appointed Minister for Energy and Local Government. Ironically the reshuffle was caused by the resignation of Terry Griffiths his replacement as Police Minister.

Following the Coalition's election defeat in 1995, Pickering resigned from Parliament. His seat was filled by Charlie Lynn as part of a deal that saw John Fahey becoming the Liberal candidate for Macarthur at the 1996 election. Fahey was successful.

References

 

1939 births
Living people
Liberal Party of Australia members of the Parliament of New South Wales
Members of the New South Wales Legislative Council
Members of the Order of Australia